Bhargavi River flows across Odisha, India. It forms the Mahanadi–Kuakhai distributary system branching off from the Kuakhai River and draining into Chilka Lake.

A branch of the Kuakhai River meets the Bay of Bengal after breaking up into numerous distributaries in the last  of its course. There are four main branches all branching off from the left bank: Kanchi, the East Kania, the Naya Nadi and the South Kanchi (which drains into Sar Lake). By various channels the first three are interconnected and finally join the Suna Munhi River, which flows into Bali Harchandi and ultimately drains to the Bay of Bengal via the mouth of Chilika. The South Kania gets lost in the marshes on the western shore of Chilika.

References

Rivers of Odisha
Tributaries of the Mahanadi River
Rivers of India